Riziki Kiseto (born 14 October 1989) is a Tanzanian cricketer. He played in the 2014 ICC World Cricket League Division Five tournament. In July 2018, he was part of Tanzania's squad in the Eastern sub region group for the 2018–19 ICC World Twenty20 Africa Qualifier tournament. In October 2021, he was named in Tanzania's Twenty20 International (T20I) squad for their matches in Group B of the 2021 ICC Men's T20 World Cup Africa Qualifier tournament in Rwanda. He made his T20I debut on 2 November 2021, for Tanzania against Mozambique. Later the same month, he was named as the vice-captain of Tanzania's squad for the Regional Final of the 2021 ICC Men's T20 World Cup Africa Qualifier tournament, also in Rwanda.

References

External links
 
 

1989 births
Living people
Tanzanian cricketers
Tanzania Twenty20 International cricketers
People from Dar es Salaam